Julie Wilson Nimmo is a Scottish actress. She is known for portraying the roles of Miss Hoolie in the BBC Children's series Balamory, Mrs Sawdust in CBeebies show 'Olga Da Polga' and DC Megan Squire in the BBC Scottish television series Scot Squad.

Career
Nimmo started her career along with a lot of other Scottish actors and comedians in the 1995 sketch show Pulp Video which was partly written by her husband Greg Hemphill and his co-writer Ford Kiernan.Between 1999 and 2002, Nimmo was a regular star in the sketch show Chewin' the Fat by the same writers. She starred in all four series and the New Year specials.

After taking a break from acting, Nimmo returned to the stage in Glasgow as So-Shy in a production of Sandy Wilson's pantomime musical Aladdin. She also briefly appeared in the Scottish comedy television series Rab C. Nesbitt, and played Elizabeth Macquarie in the docudrama, The Father of Australia.

In 2002 Nimmo starred in the BBC children show Balamory as Miss Hoolie; she starred in all four seasons ending in 2005.

She plays Lovely Sue in the Radio 4 comedy series Fags, Mags and Bags. She played Katrine Trolle and other witnesses in a radio dramatisation of the court case HM Advocate v Sheridan and Sheridan.

In 2014, she starred as a guest in a children's special of Pointless Celebrities alongside fellow Balamory star Andrew Agnew but lost in the head-to-head round.

In 2016, she starred with John Michie and Lorraine McIntosh in the BBC One Scotland horror comedy West Skerra Light, which was written and directed by her husband Greg Hemphill. She subsequently reunited with Michie and McIntosh for Hemphill's 2018 horror comedy Long Night at Blackstone.

In 2017, she played DC Megan Squire in the BBC Scotland comedy show Scot Squad. In 2018, she appeared in an episode of Still Game, alongside her husband.

In 2020, she took part in Scenes For Survival project, a response to the closure of live theatre since the beginning of the coronavirus pandemic, written and directed by her husband for National Theatre Of Scotland.

In 2021, she starred as Olive The Reindeer at Tron Theatre.

In 2022, she celebrated Balamory's 20th anniversary and return to BBC iPlayer with television and radio appearances, including This Morning with Andrew Agnew.

In October 2022, Julie co-hosted the breakfast show with Ewan Cameron, which went out across the Scottish Bauer Network.

From December 2022-January 2023, Nimmo appeared in The Wonderful Wizard of Oz at the Tron Theatre.

In November 2022, Julie starred as Mrs Sawdust, alongside husband Greg Hemphill as Mr Sawdust, in new CBeebies television series Olga da Polga.

On New Years Day 2023, Julie starred in a television programme called 'Jules' and Greg's Wild Swim' about wild swimming with actor-husband Greg Hemphill. It aired on BBC Scotland Channel and BBC iPlayer.

In January 2023, Julie returned as DC Megan Squire in BBC Scotland comedy series Scot Squad.

In February 2023, Julie returned to co-host 'Ewen and Cat at Breakfast' standing in for Cat alongside Ewen Cameron which aired across the Scottish Bauer Network.

In March 2023, Julie featured on an BBC Scotland documentary as part of the broadcaster celebrating 100 years of broadcasting.

Personal life
Nimmo is married to actor Greg Hemphill. They appeared together in the television comedies Pulp Video (1995–1996, her first major television credit), and Chewin' the Fat (1999–2002). They have two sons, Benny and Chevy. They previously lived in Titusville, Florida near Kennedy Space Center, before moving back to Glasgow.

References

External links

Living people
20th-century Scottish actresses
21st-century Scottish actresses
Actresses from Glasgow
Alumni of the Royal Conservatoire of Scotland
People from East Kilbride
Scottish radio actresses
Scottish stage actresses
Scottish television actresses
Year of birth missing (living people)